The third season of La Voz Argentina premiered on June 24, 2021, on Telefe. Marley reprised his role as the host of the show, while actress Stefi Roitman became the digital host.

Soledad Pastorutti and Ricardo Montaner returned as coaches (third and second seasons respectively). Duo Mau y Ricky and Lali became new coaches for this season. For the first time in its history, the show featured a fifth coach, Emilia Mernes, who selected contestants to participate in The Comeback Stage, a digital companion series where artists eliminated from the Blind Auditions and coached by Mernes pitted in a series of Battles for a place in the Live Shows.

On September 5, Francisco Benitez was named winner of the season, marking Soledad Pastorutti's second win as a coach.

Coaches and presenters

As in the previous season, Marley became the host of the show. This season introduced actress Stefi Roitman as the digital host of the show. Returning coaches from the previous season were Venezuelan-Argentine singer and songwriter Ricardo Montaner and folk singer Soledad Pastorutti. New coaches were confirmed to be pop singer Lali and Venezuelan Latin pop and reggaeton duo Mau y Ricky. New this season, a fifth coach in charge of "The Comeback Stage" was announced. It was later revealed to be Emilia Mernes.

Teams

Blind auditions

Battles 
The battles began on 28 July 2021. The advisors for this round were Nahuel Pennisi for Team Montaner, Miranda! for Team Soledad, Nicki Nicole for Team Mau y Ricky, and Cazzu for Team Lali. In this round, each coach can steal two losing artist from another team. Artists who win their battles or are stolen by another coach advance to the Knockouts.

Knockouts 
The knockouts round started on August 10 after the final battles. Each coach could each one losing artist from another team. The top 32 contestants move on to the playoffs.

Playoffs 
During each of the four nights of Playoffs, the eight artists from each team performed. At the end of each round, each coach picked six artists to advance. The top 24 artists moved on to the next round. Abel Pintos served as a mega mentor during this round.

The Comeback Stage 
For this season, the show added a brand new phase of competition called The Comeback Stage, exclusive to MiTelefe mobile app, La Voz Argentina YouTube channel, Instagram TV, Facebook, Twitter, and Telefe.com. Fifth coach Emilia Mernes selected artists who did not turn a chair during the Blind auditions as well as eliminated artists from later rounds of the competition.

First round 
During the first round of competition, the ten selected artists went head to head, two artists per episode, and Mernes selected a winner to move on to the next round. Originally, Mernes declared seven artists as winners in their battles, but at the end of this round she had to select only four to advance.

Second round 
In the second round, Mernes brought back four artists who were eliminated during the main competition Battles, giving them a chance to re-enter in the competition. These artists faced off against the four artists from the first round.

Third round 
In the third round, the five remaining artists and two artists who were eliminated during the main competition Knockouts performed in front of Emilia and three were selected to perform in a fourth and final round.

Final round (Lives' Round of 25) 
The contestants performed in the first night of the round of 25 for the main competition coaches' vote, with the winner officially joining one of the four main teams. Ignacio Sagalá was declared winner with 3 out of 4 votes and he decided to join Ricardo Montaner's team.

Live shows 
The live shows started on August 23 and have four different rounds: Round of 25, Quarterfinals, Semifinals and Final. Public votes were introduced in the Quarterfinals.

Round of 25

Quarterfinals

Semifinals

Finale 
The Finale aired on Sunday, September 5, where the final 4 performed a solo cover song and a duet with their coach.

Elimination chart

Color key 
Artist's info

  Team Montaner
  Team Soledad
  Team Mau y Ricky
  Team Lali

Result details

  Winner
  Runner-up
  Third place
  Fourth place
  Saved by the public
  Saved by his/her coach
  Eliminated

Overall

Teams

Notes

References

Argentina
2012 Argentine television seasons